Logosphere (Greek from logos / nous) (coined by Mikhail Bakhtin) is an adaptation of the concepts biosphere and noosphere: logosphere is derived from the interpretation of words' meanings, conceptualized through an abstract sphere.

Overview

The logosphere is not active like Vernadsky’s noosphere, but still occupies a type of four-dimensional space.

The chronotope is the conduit through which meaning enters the logosphere.

Mikhail Bakhtin's chronotope, or time-space (deterministic) makes outside-the-logosphere (unintelligible) information relevant to the logosphere through narrative structure. Time takes on a protagonist's 'flesh'.

Logosphere applications

Technological conceptualizations
The term was later taken up by virtual reality enthusiasts to describe the logical universe.

Telecommunications

The logosphere, in decades past, has been used in reference to the new world of communication created by the invention of the radio. French philosopher Gaston Bachelard proclaimed, "Everyone can hear everyone else and we can all listen in  peace." This "domain of world speech" should be called the logosphere, he reasoned.

References

Communication